Stara Sil (the former name – Stara Ropa), (Polish Stara Sól ) is an urban-type settlement in Sambir Raion, Lviv Oblast, of Western Ukraine. It belongs to Staryi Sambir urban hromada, one of the hromadas of Ukraine. Population: .

Geography 
The settlement is located in the Ukrainian Carpathians hills in the western part of the Lviv region.

History and attractions 
The first historical mention is traditionally considered the year 1254. However, according to some sources, the settlement was founded as a watchdog in the 9 -10 century. Since ancient times in the territory settlement were the extraction of salt, hence the name of the settlement.

Stara Sil was granted the Magdeburg Law in 1421.

Until 18 July 2020, Stara Sil belonged to Staryi Sambir Raion. The raion was abolished in July 2020 as part of the administrative reform of Ukraine, which reduced the number of raions of Lviv Oblast to seven. The area of Staryi Sambir Raion was merged into Sambir Raion.

Stara Sil contains a number of listed architectural monuments of Sambir Raion:
 Church of the Resurrection of Christ (XVII century, wooden). (1427 /1).
 The bell tower of the church of the Resurrection of Christ (XVII century, wooden). (1427 /2).
 Church of St. Michael (stone) (1613 - 1660, 1922-1928) (1428 /1).
 The bell tower of the church of St. Michael (mix.) XVII century. (1428 /2).
 Church of Saint Paraskevi (wooden) XVI-XVII centuries. (1429 /1).
 The bell tower of the church of St. Paraskevi XVII century. (1429 /2).

Notable people
Artist, Ludwik Dutkiewicz (1921-2008) was born in Stara Sil.

Gallery

References

External links 
 смт. Стара Сіль, Львівська область, Старосамбірський район, Облікова картка 
 Стара Сіль, церква Воскресіння Господнього XVII ст., церква Св. Параскеви XVII ст. 
 Via Est Vita. Стара Сіль. Частина 1 Костел Архістратига Михаїла 
 weather.in.ua Stara Sil'

Literature 
  Історія міст і сіл УРСР : Львівська область, Населені пункти, центри селищних і сільських Рад, Старосамбірського району, Стара Сіль. – К. : ГРУРЕ, 1968 р. Page 785 

Urban-type settlements in Sambir Raion